Here Comes Trouble is a 1936 American comedy film directed by Lewis Seiler, starring Paul Kelly, Arline Judge and Mona Barrie. The film was released on February 21, 1936 by 20th Century Fox. Duke Donovan unknowingly becomes tangled up with jewel thieves when he is give a cigarette lighter containing some stolen ruby.

Plot

Cast 
Paul Kelly as Duke Donovan
Arline Judge as Margie Simpson
Mona Barrie as Evelyn Howard
Gregory Ratoff as Ivan Petroff
Sammy Cohen as Grimy
Edward Brophy as Crowley
Halliwell Hobbes as Professor Howard
Andrew Tombes as Adams
Ernie Alexander as Harry Goodfellow
George Chandler as Brooks - Purser

References

External links 
 

1936 films
American comedy films
1936 comedy films
20th Century Fox films
Films directed by Lewis Seiler
American black-and-white films
1930s English-language films
1930s American films